Arleta is a neighborhood in the San Fernando Valley region of the city of Los Angeles, California, with a high percentage of Latino residents and of people born outside the United States.

Geography
Arleta is bordered by the Los Angeles districts of Mission Hills and North Hills on the north, Sun Valley on the east, Pacoima on the northeast, and Panorama City on the west. It lies within the 6th City Council district.

The boundaries of Arleta are roughly Paxton Avenue on the northwest, Laurel Canyon Boulevard on the northeast, Tonopah Avenue on the southeast, and Woodman Avenue on the southwest, making the square area about four (4) miles, according to Google Earth.

Demographics
The 2000 U.S. census counted 31,068 residents in the 3.10-square-mile Arleta neighborhood—or 10,034 people per square mile, an average population density for the city. In 2008, the city estimated that the population had increased to 32,622. In 2000 the median age for residents was 29, about average for city  neighborhoods. The percentage of residents aged 11 to 18 was among the county's highest.

The neighborhood was considered "moderately diverse" ethnically within Los Angeles, with a relatively high percentage of Latinos. The breakdown was Latinos, 71.7%;  Asians, 11.0%;  whites, 13.2%; blacks, 2.2%; and others, 1.9%.  Mexico (55.3%) and El Salvador (11.2%) were the most common places of birth for the 46% of the residents who were born abroad—which was a high percentage for Los Angeles.

The median yearly household income in 2008 dollars was $65,649, considered average for the city. Renters occupied 19.6% of the housing stock, and house- or apartment-owners held 80.4%. The average household size of 4.0 people was considered high for Los Angeles. The 11.5% of families headed by single parents was considered about average for city neighborhoods.

Economy
The fashion company Juicy Couture has its headquarters in Arleta.

Parks and recreation
Branford Park is located in Arleta. The facility has an auditorium, a lighted baseball diamond, an unlighted baseball diamond, lighted outdoor basketball courts, a children's play area, a community room, an indoor gymnasium with weights, an indoor gymnasium without weights, an outdoor gymnasium without weights, a kitchen, a music room, picnic tables, a lighted soccer field, a stage, lighted tennis courts, and lighted volleyball courts. In addition the Devonshire Arleta Park in Arleta.

Government and infrastructure
California's 29th congressional district — federal
California's 18th State Senate district
California's 39th State Assembly district
Los Angeles City Council District 6

The United States Postal Service Arleta Post Office is located at 9454 Arleta Avenue.  This post office was opened shortly before Christmas 1954.  The original construction was performed by Ralph Benton of Van Nuys at a total cost of $21,500.

Education

Arleta is within the Los Angeles Unified School District. The schools within Arleta are as follows:

 Arleta High School, 14200 Van Nuys Boulevard
 Sharp Avenue Elementary School, 13800 Pierce Street
 Beachy Avenue Elementary School, 9757 Beachy Avenue
 Vena Avenue Elementary School, 9377 Vena Avenue
 Canterbury Avenue Elementary School, 13670 Montague Street
 Bert Corona Charter Middle School, 9400 Remick Avenue

Infrastructure

Transportation
Arleta is accessible from the Golden State Freeway (I-5) and the Hollywood Freeway (SR 170).  Major thoroughfares include Van Nuys Boulevard, Woodman Avenue, Arleta Avenue, as well as Sheldon, Branford, Osborne and Terra Bella Streets. Metro Rapid route 761 provides fast transit on Van Nuys Boulevard, and Metro route 158, goes up Woodman Avenue, but turns on Arleta Avenue via Brandford Street, and continues along Devonshire St into Granada Hills, Northridge, and Chatsworth, respectively.

Libraries
Los Angeles Public Library operates the Granada Hills Branch.

Notable people
 Missy Avila (murder victim)
 Johnny Burnette, rockabilly singer
 The Osmonds, singing group
Sharon Shapiro, gymnast

Popular culture

Arleta was also the filming location for the fictitious McFly family in the Back to the Future series.

See also

 Van Nuys Boulevard
 List of neighborhoods and districts in Los Angeles

References

External links

Arleta Neighborhood Council
Council District 6
 Arleta Comments about living in Arleta
 Palms Arleta crime map and statistics

 
Communities in the San Fernando Valley
Neighborhoods in Los Angeles
Chicano and Mexican neighborhoods in California